Sin ti (English title: Without you) is a Mexican telenovela produced by Angelli Nesma Medina for Televisa in 1997. This telenovela based on 1980 Mexican telenovela Verónica.

On December 8, 1997, Canal de las Estrellas started broadcasting Sin ti weekdays at 4:30pm, replacing Volver a Empezar. The last episode was broadcast on April 10, 1998, with Una luz en el camino replacing it the following day.

Gabriela Rivero and Rene Strickler starred as protagonists, while Adamari López and Roberto Vander starred as antagonists.

Cast 
 
Gabriela Rivero as Sagrario Molina
René Strickler as Luis David Luján
Adamari López as María Elena Ysaguirre
Roberto Vander as Guillermo Ysaguirre
Saby Kamalich as Dolores Vda. de Luján
Irán Eory as Mercedes
Diana Golden as Elena de Ysaguirre
Consuelo Duval as Gloria
Raúl Magaña as Mauricio
Gabriela Goldsmith as Prudencia
Francesca Guillén as Sandra
Germán Gutiérrez as César
Renée Varsi as Abril
Lourdes Reyes as Ángeles Rubio-Castillo
Isabel Andrade as Crescencia
Vanessa Angers as Leonor Molina
Rosita Bouchot as Irene
Rebeca Mankita as Katy
Marina Marín as Lía
Evangelina Martínez as Gertrudis
Justo Martínez as Dr. Juárez
Servando Manzetti as Nicolás Rubio-Castillo
Carlos Bracho as Félix Guzmán
Mercedes Molto as Brenda
Carlos Monden as Professor Prado
Polly as Aurelia
Adriana Rojo as Professor Rojo
Myrrah Saavedra as Evelia
Ariadne Welter as Tomasa
Fernando Sáenz as Mateo
Sergio Sánchez as Amadeo
Yadira Santana as Angustias Durán de Rubio-Castillo
Ricardo Vera as Lic. Gómez
Liza Willert as Professor Torres
Luis Maya as Pablito
Montserrat de León as Lupita
Priscilla Greco as Ana
Marco Antonio Calvillo as Baltazar
Gustavo Rojo as Don Nicolás "Nico" Rubio-Castillo
Julio Mannino as Beto
Héctor Sánchez as Eduardo
Bertha del Castillo as Dr. Zepeda
Rodolfo Lago as Obregón

References

External links

1997 telenovelas
Mexican telenovelas
1997 Mexican television series debuts
1998 Mexican television series endings
Television shows set in Mexico
Televisa telenovelas
Children's telenovelas
Mexican television series based on Venezuelan television series
Spanish-language telenovelas